The Whirinaki River is a river of the Hawke's Bay and Bay of Plenty Regions of New Zealand's North Island.

See also
List of rivers of New Zealand

References

Rivers of the Hawke's Bay Region
Rivers of the Bay of Plenty Region
Rivers of New Zealand